Noddy (Noddy in Toyland and The Noddy Shop) is a live-action/animated children's television series based on Enid Blyton's children's book series of the same name featuring the animated episodes from Noddy's Toyland Adventures. The show was broadcast from 7 September 1998 to 11 December 1999 and broadcast on TVOntario and CBC Television in Canada.

Plot
The show starred Sean McCann as Noah Tomten, a former old salt, who now runs an antique shop in Littleton Falls, the NODDY Shop (this stood for "Notions, Oddities, Doodads & Delights of Yesterday"). His catchphrases included "What in tarnation?!" and "Great Neptune's Ghost!", usually whenever he was excited about something. It also starred Jayne Eastwood as his scatterbrained sister, Agatha Flugelschmidt, who runs a hat shop next door to the Noddy Shop. Her catchphrases include "Oh, pish posh!", usually after she disagrees with something that someone else said.

The stories in The Noddy Shop mainly centered on three children, Noah's grandchildren, Kate and Truman, and a friend of Kate's named Daniel Johnson, shortened to D.J., who came to play at the shop, and were collected by their (unseen) parents at the end of the day, implying the episodes were set after school, during school holidays or weekends.

In the second season, Truman gained the ability to talk to the toys in the shop, and Noddy gained a more prominent role in the live action segments, often interacting with the toys and Truman. Most of the stories were repeated from the first season with some minor additions, as well as also introducing new stories coming from the fourth and final season of Noddy's Toyland Adventures.

Most episodes had a moral message, which was conveyed with a Noddy story, usually told by Kate using the Noddy dolls in the shop, which the viewer saw as re-dubbed and re-scored Noddy animations. The moral message was also a theme in a song sung by the shop's population of anthropomorphic toys. There was sometimes a second song, usually a re enactment of a popular folk tale. These songs were written by Nashville-based composer Dennis Scott.

Characters

Humans
 Noah Tomten (played by Sean McCann) is a former old salt and owner of the Noddy Shop.
 Kate Tomten (played by Katie Boland) is Noah's granddaughter and Truman's older sister.
 Daniel "D.J." Johnson (played by Kyle Kass) is Kate and Truman's friend.
 Truman Tomten (played by Max Morrow) is Noah's grandson and Kate's younger brother.
 Agatha Flugelschmidt (née Tomten) (played by Jayne Eastwood) is Noah's younger scatterbrained sister and Kate and Truman's great aunt. She is the owner of the hat shop, which is next door to the Noddy Shop.
 Officer Carl Spiffy (played by Dan Redican) is Littleton Falls' senior crossing guard. He is often confident in some suspicious activities. He then retired at the end of the first season.
 Bud Topper (played by Neil Crone) is Littleton Falls' second crossing guard. He is a young crossing guard who often gets into practical jokes and hilarious chases around town. He replaced Carl Spiffy, starting with the second-season episode "Little Swap of Horrors".
 Davy Gladhand (played by Gerry Quigely) is a quirky, wisecracking salesman. He often tells jokes and is good friends with Noah. In the regular episodes, he wears a straw boater hat, while in the Christmas episode "Anything Can Happen at Christmas", he wears a red bowler hat.
 Hilda Sweetly (played by Taborah Johnson) is an ice cream saleswoman dressed in an ice cream costume. She and Noah are romantically involved by the end of the series.
 April May McJune (played by Gina Sorell) is a cautious animal wrangler. She can take care of animals such as a rabbit, a parrot, or even a skunk.
 Charlene von Pickings (played by Fiona Reid) is a posh and snobby rich woman who speaks with a British accent and is very difficult to impress.
 Jake (played by Albert Rosos) is a teenager who visits the Noddy Shop. In "Following Directions", he was sent to give Agatha and the kids directions while Noah takes off when he has the flu.
 Itchy (played by Stephen Joffe) is Aunt Agatha's grandson.
 Rox (played by Lauren Collins) is a girl who, along with Grit, challenged Kate and D.J. to a race in Sports Day.
 Grit (played by Jake Goldsbie) is a boy who, along with Rox, challenged Kate and D.J. to a race in Sports Day.
 Sam (played by Daniel Madger) is Truman's new friend. In "Ask Permission", he takes the mermaid without asking Noah, so Truman decides to tell Sam the Noddy story about Noddy setting a trap for Sammy Sailor, like the one Kate told him.
 Robbie MacRhino (played by Burke Lawrence) is a mascot dressed as a green rhino in a traditional Scottish kilt.
 Ed Caruso (played by Greg Cross) is Robbie MacRhino's singing presenter who introduces Robbie MacRhino in song.

Toys and Antiques
Noddy (voiced by Catherine Disher) is the central character of the animated segments. During the live action segments in Season 2, he is mostly still, but occasionally wanders around and talks to Truman and often the shop toys.
 Warloworth Q. Weasel (usually known simply as Warlow) (voiced by Frank Meschkuleit) is a malicious weasel in a bowler hat who resides in a Jack-in-the-box and always plays tricks on the other toys, but usually gets his comeuppance. When he pops out of the box, he sings and tap dances in his tap shoes on his feet.
 Bonita Flamingo is a bright orange plush flamingo dressed like Carmen Miranda. She speaks in an exaggerated Spanish accent, often saying things in Spanish and English.
 Johnny Crawfish (voiced by James Rankin) is a lobster who tells a lot of jokes and resides in a fish tank, and sometimes plays rock and roll songs on the piano. He is inspired by Johnny Carson.
Big Ears (voiced by Benedict Campbell) is a friendly gnome who is Noddy's helper and father figure in the animated segments. Unlike Noddy, he never moves or talks at all during the live action segments.
 Sherman (voiced by James Rankin) is a clockwork turtle with wheels like a tank, who wears an army helmet.
 Rusty (voiced by Matt Ficner) is a toy clown who is good friends with Sherman, and always rides on his back.
 Planet Pup (voiced by James Rankin) is a small robotic dog, supposedly from outer space. He was the first toy to interact with Truman and gets along with him.
 Lichtenstein (voiced by Matt Ficner) is a beer tankard shaped like a Viking's head, usually referred to simply as "Stein". He doesn't speak much, but could usually be seen singing along with the songs. When Litchenstein does speak, he has a noticeable German accent, and ends many of his sentences with "Ja".
 Island Princess (voiced by Alyson Court) is a wooden carving, rather like a ship's figurehead, in a traditional Hawaiian costume. She sees everything that goes on in the shop, and sometimes alerts the toys to the pranks of the Goblins.
 Gertie Gator (voiced by Taborah Johnson) is a plastic alligator who stands on two legs, wears red glasses, a purple dress and carries a matching umbrella. In the song from the episode "Growing Lies", Gertie Gator wears a yellow choir gown, indicating that the song is gospel and pop.
 Granny Duck (voiced by Noreen Young) is a wise plastic duck on wheels who wears a red hat, glasses and who usually speaks in rhyme.
 The Do-Wop Penguins are four penguins who never speak and only sing in every episode, sometimes as Gertie Gator's backing group. Along with the Ruby Reds, they often provide short interludes introducing the Noddy story, or a turning point in the action of the episode.
 Ruby Reds is a box of five fake lips who also have no spoken dialogue, but sing in every episode, sometimes as Johnny Crawfish's backing group.
 Fred (voiced by Matt Ficer and Gingersnap (voiced by James Rankin) are a couple of porcelain pig figurines in matching outfits- one blue, one pink- and berets.  They speak in an exaggerated French accent.
 Whiny and Whimper are two babies, one male, one female – one is dressed in pink, the other in blue – in a cradle. They often cry at any tense situation like lost rattles.  They are usually found singing with the other characters. In one episode, a miscast spell by Boobull causes them to speak like teenagers.
 Shorty Salt Shaker (voiced by Frank Meschkyleit) and Slim Pepper Shaker (voiced by James Rankin) are Salt and pepper shakers shaped like saguaro, with cowboy hats and bandannas- one red, one blue. They speak with a Southern accent.
 Gaylord Gumball (voiced by Frank Meschkuleit) is a wise gumball machine, who's handles and slot resemble a moustache and mouth.
 Wind-up Teeth are a pair of wind up chattery teeth that chatters when excited or scared.

Minor Human Characters
 Gus (played by George Buza) is a garbage truck driver who appears in the episode "Going Bananas". He was first introduced when he stopped by the Noddy Shop to inform Noah that he shall get himself a banana, as well as a hat. Unfortunately, the battery in his truck died, so he decided to stick around until he gets back on the road.
 Seymour Polutski (played by Jeff Pustil) is the main antagonist of the series finale episode "Closing Up Shop". When Noah was lacking consumers, he accepted the deal to buy the shop and attempted to turn the Noddy Shop into a cigar store. When the kids tell him that smoking was not permitted, he snaps at them. Later on, when Polutski was about to light the cigar, Disrupto stops him and informs him smoking is prohibited in the store and confiscates his cigar with his left claw. But before Polutski can retrieve the cigar, he accidentally leans on the new toy Goopy Gary, used by Warloworth Q. Weasel as a trap. As a result, Polutski escapes the store, never to be seen again.
 Noah's Customers are assorted customers of Noah's at the Noddy Shop appear in either small or large roles in some episodes, like the people do in "Growing Lies" where three customers speak.

Minor Toy Characters
 The Tooth Fairy (played by Carol Kane) appeared in "The Tooth Fairy". She is a fairy who comes to see Truman in the shop who gets a loose tooth.
 Jack Frost (played by Gilbert Gottfried) appears in "Jack Frost is Coming to Town". He lives inside a snow globe.
 Disrupto is a robot who appears in "Big Bullies" and "The Human Touch". In the latter episode, it is revealed that he is capable of interacting with a computer. He then appeared in the series finale "Closing Up Shop", where he informs Seymour Polutski that smoking is not permitted in the shop before confiscating the cigar with his left claw and using the new toy Goopy Gary as a trap, prompting Polutski to escape and withdrawing from his proposal.
 Angelina appears in "Part of the Family". She was forgotten in Noah's stockroom, but was brought to life upon the presence of a visitor named Julie.
 Annabelle (played by Betty White) appears in "Anything Can Happen at Christmas". She is Santa Claus's wife who comes to check on her favourite toys in the shop.
 The Sandman (played by Colin Fox) appears in "The Sandman Cometh". He casts a spell that puts everyone in the shop to sleep.

Cast

Live-action cast
 Sean McCann as Noah Tomten, a former sailor who now runs an antique shop called the Noddy Shop.
 Katie Boland as Kate Tomten, Noah's granddaughter.
 Max Morrow as Truman Tomten, Noah's grandson.
 Kyle Kassardjian as Daniel "D.J." Johnson, Kate and Truman's friend.
 Jayne Eastwood as Agatha Flugelschmidt, Noah's scatterbrained sister, who owns the hat shop next door.  She is good friends with the children, who call her Aunt Agatha.  She is married, but her husband is unseen.
 Dan Redican as Officer Carl Spiffy (Season 1 only)
 Neil Crone as Officer Bud Topper (Season 2 only)
 Taborah Johnson as Miss Hilda Sweetly, an ice-cream vendor who pushes a cart dressed as a giant strawberry ice-cream cone (vanilla in an early episode).  There is implication that she and Noah are romantically attracted to each other.
 Gerry Quigley as Davy Gladhand, a salesman.
 Gina Sorell as April May McJune,  a Brownie leader and friend of Aunt Agatha's.
 Albert Rosos as Jake, a teenager who visits the Noddy Shop.
 Stephen Joffe as Itchy, Aunt Agatha's nephew.
 Jake Goldsbie as Grit, a boy in Sports Day.
 Lauren Collins as Rox, a girl in Sports Day.
 Daniel Magder as Sam, Truman's new friend.
 Burke Lawrence as Robbie MacRhino, a mascot dressed as a green rhino in a traditional Scottish kilt.
 Greg Cross as Ed Caruso, Robbie MacRhino's singing presenter.
 Jim Calder as Lurk Goblin, the father in a family of goblins who live in a small doll's house and create much of the drama in the series.  He mainly talks gibberish, with a few recognisable words.
 Nikki Pascetta as Snipe Goblin, the mother of the Goblin Family.  Like her husband Lurk, she mainly speaks in gibberish.
 Gil Filar as Boobull Goblin, the son of Lurk and Snipe.  Despite being the youngest, he is intelligent, speaks proper English, and appears to be in charge of his Mom and Dad.

Guest Stars
 Carol Kane as the Tooth Fairy (in "The Tooth Fairy")
 Fiona Reid as Charlene von Pickings (in "To the Rescue", "Telling the Whole Truth", "How Rude" and "Be Patient")
 Marc Donato as Dewey (in "Mixed Up Masks")
 Harry Anderson as Jack Fable (in "The Magic Show")
 Gilbert Gottfried as Jack Frost (in "Jack Frost is Coming to Town")
 Gerard Parkes as Wally the Wanderer (in "Noah's Leaving")
 Betty White as Annabelle (in "Anything Can Happen at Christmas")
 Colin Fox as the Sandman (in "The Sandman Cometh")
 Graham Harley as Rodney Styx (in "The Big Showdown")
 Cass Van Wyck as Julie (in "Part of the Family")
 Michael Cera as Butch (in "Big Bullies") 
 George Buza as Gus the Garbage Truck Driver (in "Going Bananas")
 Jeff Pustil as Seymour Polutski (in "Closing Up Shop")
 Shadia Simmons
 Michael Seater

Puppet Voices
 Frank Meschkuleit
 Matt Ficner
 James Rankin

Voice cast

Original UK 
 Susan Sheridan: as Noddy, Tessie Bear, Dinah Doll, Sly, Clockwork Mouse Miss Pink Cat, Martha Monkey; Mrs Tubby Bear, Mrs Noah, & Lady Giraffe
 Jimmy Hibbert: Big Ears, Mr Plod, Bumpy Dog, Noddy's Car, Gobbo, Sammy Sailor, Mr Sparks, Mr Straw, Mr Wobbly Man, Mr Milko, Mr Noah, Mr Train Driver, Mr Jumbo, Bunkey, Father Christmas (Santa), & Lord Giraffe

Puppeteers
 Matt Ficner
 Frank Meschkuleit
 James Rankin
 Gord Robertson
 Anthony Asbury
 John Pattison
 Noreen Young
 Stephen Brathwaite

Episodes

Season 1 (1998)

Christmas Special (1998)

Season 2 (1999)

Reception 
In its first season on PBS, the show was seen by an average of 2.5 million viewers per episode, higher than Sesame Street's average during the same year.

International success 
Due to almost instantaneous success in the US and Canada, BBC Worldwide decided to distribute the series overseas. "Anything Can Happen at Christmas" was shown on CBBC in the UK in 1998. The first season of the show later aired there from 1999 to 2000 and was also shown in Australia, Malaysia and several countries in English. This version utilized the original sound-track for the Noddy animations. The live action segments were unaltered. The second season was never reversioned for the UK or Australia but was dubbed for other countries. The series was also dubbed for Poland, Spain, France, Israel, Mexico, and Portugal. A music video involving the character Johnny Crawfish, "Special", was made to promote the overseas airings.

Awards 

|-
| 1999
| Jayne Eastwood for playing Agatha Flugelschmidt in the episode "The Trouble With Truman"
| Gemini Award For Best Performance in a Pre-School Program or Series
| 
|-
| 1999
| Sean McCann for playing Noah Tomten in the episode "The Trouble With Truman"
| Gemini Award For Best Performance in a Pre-School Program or Series
| 
|-
| 2000
| Juul Haalmeyer for designing Noah Tomten and Agatha Flugelschmidt's costumes
| Daytime Emmy Award for Outstanding Achievement in Costume Design/Styling
| 
|-
| 1999
| Jayne Eastwood for playing Agatha Flugelschmidt in the episode "Be Patient"
| Gemini Award For Best Performance in a Pre-School Program or Series
| 
|-
| 1999
| Sean McCann for playing Noah Tomten in the episode "Slugger"
| Gemini Award For Best Performance in a Pre-School Program or Series
|

VHS/DVD releases

External links

References

CBC Television original programming
BBC children's television shows
TVO original programming
1998 British television series debuts
1999 British television series endings
1990s British animated television series
1990s British children's television series
1990s British workplace comedy television series
1990s Canadian animated television series
1990s Canadian children's television series
1990s Canadian workplace comedy television series
1990s preschool education television series
1998 Canadian television series debuts
1999 Canadian television series endings
Television shows filmed in Toronto
Animated preschool education television series
Animated television series about children
British children's animated comedy television series
British children's animated fantasy television series
British children's animated musical television series
British preschool education television series
British stop-motion animated television series
British television shows based on children's books
British television shows featuring puppetry
British television series with live action and animation
Canadian children's animated comedy television series
Canadian children's animated fantasy television series
Canadian children's animated musical television series
Canadian preschool education television series
Canadian stop-motion animated television series
Canadian television shows based on children's books
Canadian television shows featuring puppetry
Canadian television series with live action and animation
English-language television shows
Sentient toys in fiction
Television series set in shops
Television series by BBC Studios
Television series by Universal Television